The Women's 50 metre breaststroke competition of the 2020 European Aquatics Championships was held on 22 and 23 May 2021.

Records
Before the competition, the existing world, European and championship records were as follows.

The following new records were set during this competition.

Results

Heats
The heats were started on 22 May at 10:52.

Semifinals
The semifinals were started on 22 May at 18:57.

Semifinal 1

Semifinal 2

Final
The final was held on 23 May at 18:10.

References

External links

Women's 50 metre breaststroke